Batrachology is the branch of zoology concerned with the study of amphibians including frogs and toads, salamanders, newts, and caecilians. It is a sub-discipline of herpetology, which also includes non-avian reptiles (snakes, lizards, amphisbaenids, turtles, terrapins, tortoises, crocodilians, and the tuatara). Batrachologists may study the evolution, ecology, ethology, or anatomy of amphibians.

Amphibians are cold blooded vertebrates largely found in damp habitats although many species have special behavioural adaptations that allow them to live in deserts, trees, underground and in regions with wide seasonal variations in temperature. There are over 7250 species of amphibians.

Notable batrachologists
 Jean Marius René Guibé
 Gabriel Bibron
 Oskar Boettger
 George Albert Boulenger
 Edward Drinker Cope
 François Marie Daudin
 Franz Werner
 Leszek Berger

References

Herpetology
Subfields of zoology